A Good Librarian Like a Good Shepherd, known in Japan as , is a Japanese adult visual novel developed by August and released on January 25, 2013 for Windows as a DVD. The gameplay in Daitoshokan no Hitsujikai follows a branching plot line which offers pre-determined scenarios with courses of interaction, and focuses on the appeal of the five female main characters by the player character. A fan disc for Windows titled Daitoshokan no Hitsujikai: Hōkago Shippo Days was released in August 2013. A second, adult fan disc titled Daitoshokan no Hitsujikai: Dreaming Sheep was released in March 2014. A PlayStation Vita port of the original game and fan discs featuring additional content was released in February 2015.

There have been five manga adaptations based on the game published by ASCII Media Works, Ichijinsha, Kadokawa Shoten and Media Factory. Comic anthologies and light novels were also published, as were several music albums. An anime television series adaptation animated by Hoods Entertainment and Felix Film aired between October and December 2014.

Gameplay

Daitoshokan no Hitsujikai is a romance visual novel in which the player assumes the role of Kyōtarō Kakei. Much of its gameplay is spent reading the text that appears on the screen, which represents the story's narrative and dialogue. The text is accompanied by character sprites, which represent who Kyōtarō is talking to, over background art. Throughout the game, the player encounters CG artwork at certain points in the story, which take the place of the background art and character sprites. Daitoshokan no Hitsujikai follows a branching plot line with multiple endings, and depending on the decisions that the player makes during the game, the plot will progress in a specific direction.

There are five main plot lines that the player will have the chance to experience, one for each of the heroines in the story. Throughout gameplay, the player is given multiple options to choose from, and text progression pauses at these points until a choice is made. Some decisions can lead the game to end prematurely and offer an alternative ending to the plot. To view all plot lines in their entirety, the player will have to replay the game multiple times and choose different choices to further the plot to an alternate direction. Throughout gameplay, there are scenes depicting Kyōtarō and a given heroine having sex.

Plot
When Kyōtarō was young, he aspired to read all the magic books in the world which were kept in the magic library. He was given a bookmark by a shepherd, which was his entry ticket to access the magic library. He must show kindness and bring happiness to people he encounters. As the sole member of the Library Club, he enjoys the fact that he can read peacefully by himself. After receiving a text from the 'shepherd', which reads his fate is going to change, Kyōtarō encounters a second-year girl named Tsugumi Shirasaki, whom he saves at the train station. Later that day, Tsugumi enters the Library Club, she thanks him, and asks for his help to make Shiomi Academy a more enjoyable place. Like Kyōtarō, Tsugumi has also received a text from the shepherd. With the shepherd's guidance, more students end up joining their group.

Characters

Main characters

 (anime)
Kyōtarō is a second-year student majoring in humanities. He is a bookworm, and is often seen reading a book in public. He was originally the sole member of the Library Club. Kyōtarō likes to help others and is a kind, collected person. He is the object of affection for most of the girls in his club and doesn't seem aware until Tsugumi's confession and noticing the other girl's affections.

 (PC), Madoka Yonezawa (anime)
Tsugumi is a girl with long reddish brown hair tied in twintails, whom Kyōtarō encounters at the train station. She later becomes the official leader of the Library Club. She is good at sewing and cooking. Tsugumi makes it her job to make lunch for the others every day. She has feelings for Kyōtarō and confesses to him in episode 10.

 (PC), Yuka Saitō (anime)
Tamamo is a girl with very long black hair tied into a ponytail, and is Tsugumi's best friend. She becomes a member of the Library Club. She is the type who gets jealous easily. Tamamo is quite independent, as she lives alone in a luxury apartment, and has high practical skills. She develops feelings for Kyōtarō after he helps her overcome a need to work and she sees his kind side.

 (PC), Nozomi Yamamoto (anime)
Senri is a girl with short, pretty lilac-colored hair. She becomes a member of the Library Club. Most of the time, she is expressionless, and seems to have a cool attitude. Senri is a talented singer, and at one time, she won a national contest. She enjoys crossword puzzles, though she is not necessarily very good at it. She develops feelings for Kyōtarō when he persuades her to make her own path.

 (PC), Eri Sendai (anime)
Kana is a girl with long, wavy blonde hair with a white Alice band, and is a member of the Library Club. She has a bright, polite personality. She has a part time job as a waitress. Kana has a mild allergy to cats, so she cannot come into close contact with one. She develops feelings for Kyōtarō after he advises her to truly be herself.

 (PC), Atsumi Tanezaki (anime)
Nagi is a girl with short reddish hair, tied into twintails. She is a member of the Library Committee, not a member of the Library Club. She lives next door to Kyōtarō, making them next door neighbors. It is later revealed that she is Kyōtarō's half-sister, from whom he was separated many years prior; they were born from the same father, but different mothers. Despite initial attempts to impede him on being a Shepherd, she shows that she truly cares for him.

Secondary characters

 (PC), Showtaro Morikubo (anime) 
Ikkei is Kyōtarō's classmate and best friend, who joins the Library Club. He used to be part of the karate club, but had to quit because of a foot injury. He is aware that all the girls prefer Kyōtarō and is jealous of it. Nonetheless, he is a good friend to Kyōtarō and is pleased the club has a good effect on him.

 (PC), Saki Nakajima (anime)
Maho is a girl with long white hair, and is the student council president. She is often trying to get Kyōtarō to join the student council, suggesting that she has feelings for Kyōtarō.

 
Miyu is a girl with long pink hair. She is a member of the broadcasting unit and drama club.

 (PC), Miyu Kashiwagi (anime)
Sayumi is a short girl with long, light blue hair. She wears a hat at all times, which she slams on the floor whenever she's angry. She is shown to be fond of first-person shooter games.

 (PC), Kei Mizusawa (anime)
Aoi is a girl with long blue hair in a low ponytail. She is the student council vice president.

 (PC), Yō Taichi (anime)
Sayori is the sickly younger sister of Tsugumi. Despite being ill, she has a bright, positive personality, like her sister.

 (PC), Satoshi Tsuruoka (anime)
Gizaemon or as he is called Giza, is a fat, male cat with a black and white coat. He is seemingly a stray cat that wandered into the school library and is often seen hanging out with the club members. He is particularly close to Takamine who is often seen holding him. He is very perverted, as he poked fun at Kana's small bust and seems interested in well-endowed girls like Kodachi.

The shepherd is well known throughout the school, and is rumored to appear in front of those who are working hard, and grant wishes.

 (PC), Taiten Kusunoki (anime)
Nanai is the man whom Kakei met in his childhood, and was the one who gave him the way to the magic library. In the present day, he is Kodachi's supervisor, and though he initially didn't approve her acts of indirectly forming the library club for Kakei, he comes to see they had a good effect on him. He is later revealed to be the biological father of both Kyōtarō and Kodachi.

Hōkago Shippo Days

Kei Kirishima is a cat lover.

Nozomi is a girl with long light pink hair, she is Kei's childhood friend and lives in the same apartment as him.

Sakuya is a girl with long brown hair, and is also a childhood friend of Kei's. She has a very straightforward and honest personality. Sakuya is good when it comes to housework.

Development and release
Daitoshokan no Hitsujikai is the ninth title developed by the visual novel developer August, after their previous titles such as Fortune Arterial and Aiyoku no Eustia. The project was overseen by game director Rune, and the scenario was written by three people: Taku Sakakibara, Hiroyuki Uchida, and Hideaki Anzai. Character design and art direction for the game was provided by Bekkankō, and CG supervision was handled by Michi. The game's background music was produced by members of Active Planets. Daitoshokan no Hitsujikai was released on January 25, 2013 as a DVD for Windows as a limited edition version. The regular edition was released on January 31, 2014. A fan disc for Windows titled , rated for ages 15 and older, was initially sold at Comiket 84 on August 10, 2013 and later for general sale on January 31, 2014. An adult fan disc for Windows titled  was released on March 28, 2014. A PlayStation Vita port of the original Windows game and the two fan discs under the title Daitoshokan no Hitsujikai: Library Party was released on February 15, 2015. The port also contains additional content, such as the addition of a new heroine.

Adaptations

Print media
A manga adaptation, titled Daitoshokan no Hitsujikai and illustrated by Akane Sasaki, began serialization in the May 2012 issue of ASCII Media Works' Dengeki G's Magazine. The manga ended serialization in the magazine's May 2014 issue and continued serialization in Dengeki G's Comic between the June 2014 and January 2015 issues. The first volume of Daitoshokan no Hitsujikai was released on November 27, 2012; two volumes have been released as of July 27, 2013. A second manga, titled Daitoshokan no Hitsujikai: The Little Lutra Lutra and illustrated by Shiroi Kusaka, was serialized between the July 2012 and June 2013 issues of Kadokawa Shoten's Comptiq. Two volumes of The Little Lutra Lutra were released between December 26, 2012 and June 6, 2013.

A third manga, titled Daitoshokan no Hitsujikai: Lovely Librarians and illustrated by Rico, began serialization in the September 2012 issue of ASCII Media Works' Dengeki Hime. The first volume of Lovely Librarians was released on March 15, 2013; two volumes have been released as of December 12, 2013. A fourth manga, titled Daitoshokan no Hitsujikai: Library 4 You and illustrated by Wasabi, began serialization in the October 2012 issue of Ichijinsha's Manga 4-koma Palette. The first volume of Library 4 You was released on July 22, 2013. A fifth manga, titled  and illustrated by Norio Tsukudani, was serialized between the November 2012 and October 2013 issues of Media Factory's Monthly Comic Alive. Two volumes of Hitoribotchi no Diva were released between February 23 and October 23, 2013. Ichijinsha published two volumes of a manga anthology illustrated by various artists titled Daitoshokan no Hitsujikai: Comic Anthology between April 25 and June 25, 2013.

A 56-page "super prelude" book for Daitoshokan no Hitsujikai was published by Enterbrain on July 27, 2012. A light novel titled Daitoshokan no Hitsujikai: Overture, written by Noritake Tao and illustrated by Bekkankō, was published by Enterbrain on August 30, 2012. A 63-page Daitoshokan no Hitsujikai heroine profile book was published by Kadokawa Shoten on December 20, 2012. Enterbrain published two volumes of a light novel series adaptation of Daitoshokan no Hitsujikai, written by Noritake Tao and illustrated by Masao Aona, with cover illustrations by Bekkankō, between January 30 and April 30, 2013. Enterbrain also published a 320-page visual fan book on June 28, 2013, consisting of detailed story explanations, character introductions, rough illustrations, stage commentaries and interviews from the staff and cast.

Anime
An anime television series adaptation animated by Hoods Entertainment and Felix Film aired in Japan between October 8 and December 24, 2014. An original video animation episode was bundled with the first DVD and Blu-ray compilation volumes released on December 25, 2014. The direction, character design and animation direction is shared by five people under the collective name Team Nico: Ken'ichi Konishi, Tomomi Kamiya, Asami Sodeyama, Kaori Hayashi and Yū Nobuta. The screenplay is written by Kiyoko Yoshimura and the music is produced by Active Planets. The anime has been licensed for streaming in North America by Funimation, and was released on Blu-ray and DVD on July 12, 2016.

Episode list

Music
Daitoshokan no Hitsujikai has nine pieces of theme music: two opening themes, two ending themes, and five insert songs.

The single for "Straight Sheep", which also contains "Yume Kai Biyori", was released on August 24, 2012. The single for "Ashita e no Shiori", which also contains "Dear Smile", was released on January 25, 2013. An image song album titled Daitoshokan no Hitsujikai: Vocal Collection was released on March 29, 2013. The game's original soundtrack was released on May 24, 2013 in a three-disc collection containing 41 tracks.

The anime has two pieces of theme music.

Reception
In 2012, Daitoshokan no Hitsujikai ranked four times in the top ten in national PC game pre-orders in Japan. The rankings were at No. 4 in September, No. 3 in October, and twice at No. 2 in November and December. Daitoshokan no Hitsujikai ranked first in terms of national sales of PC games in Japan in January 2013. Daitoshokan no Hitsujikai was No. 1 in the 2013 sales ranking on Getchu.com, a major redistributor of visual novel and domestic anime products. The game maintained first place in sales ranking for the month of its release, and in February the ranking dropped down to No. 11. The fan disc, Daitoshokan no Hitsujikai: Dreaming Sheep, ranked at No. 1 in sales for March 2014. In April 2014, Dreaming Sheep ranking in sales dropped down to No. 20.

In January 2013, Daitoshokan no Hitsujikai was voted No. 1 in Getchu's Bishōjo Game Awards as the best game of the month. It was voted as the best overall title of 2013, and ranked fourth in the vote results for the best scenario. Daitoshokan no Hitsujikai has also been ranked third in the 2013 game ranking for system, third in the 2013 game ranking for graphics, first place in the 2013 game ranking for music, and second in the 2013 game ranking for best movie. In the 2013 character poll held on Getchu, Suzuki Kana was voted No. 2, Kodachi Nagi at No. 12, and Ureshino Sayumi at No. 20.

Notes

References

External links

Daitoshokan no Hitsujikai at August 
Daitoshokan no Hitsujikai: Library Party official website 
 Anime official website 
 
 

2013 video games
Anime television series based on video games
ASCII Media Works manga
Bishōjo games
Dengeki Comics
Dengeki G's Magazine
Eroge
Famitsu Bunko
Funimation
Felix Film
Harem anime and manga
Hoods Entertainment
Ichijinsha manga
Japan-exclusive video games
Kadokawa Dwango franchises
Kadokawa Shoten manga
Media Factory manga
OVAs based on video games
PlayStation Vita games
Romance anime and manga
Romance video games
School life in anime and manga
Seinen manga
Tokyo MX original programming
Urban fantasy anime and manga
Video games developed in Japan
Visual novels
Windows games
August (company) games